The R68A is a B Division New York City Subway car order consisting of 200 cars built between 1988 and 1989 by Kawasaki Rail Car Company in Kobe, Japan, with final assembly done at the Kawasaki plant in Yonkers, New York. A total of 200 cars were built, arranged in four-car sets.

The R68A was the fourth and final R-type contract to be built with  cars (the previous three being the R44, R46, and R68). The contract had been given to Kawasaki because the manufacturers of the base R68 order, the joint venture Westinghouse-Amrail Company, had experienced significant integration issues that led to performance problems with the R68s. The first R68A train entered service on May 18, 1988. The R68As are scheduled to remain in service until at least 2025–2030.

Description
The R68As are numbered 5001–5200. While the 75-foot length allows more room for sitting and standing passengers per car than the  length that was previously used, these cars suffer from clearance issues and cannot run on the BMT Eastern Division. Additionally, the reduced number of doors on a train of eight  cars have led to increased boarding and dwelling times.

One set also runs on the  train during weekday afternoon rush hours. Like the previous R68 order, the R68As were originally single units, with a full-width cab on one end and a half-width cab on the other end. They were eventually linked into four-car sets and continue to run in this configuration.

History

Delivery and revenue service

The first R68A cars were delivered to New York on April 12, 1988, and transferred to TA facilities the following day. The cars replaced all of the remaining R10s, R27s, and unrebuilt R30s, all of which were retired between 1989 and 1993. The R68As were built with American and Japanese parts.

The R68As' first entry to revenue service was on May 18, 1988, on the Bronx and Manhattan half of the divided D train with the first fleet consisting of the consist 5010-5001-5006-5008-5009-5007-5004-5005. Originally, the R68A order was supposed to be a second option order of the R68. However, due to poor performance from the R68 cars produced by Westinghouse-Amrail, along with other issues, the MTA gave the order to Kawasaki, with an offer of $958,000 per car versus Westinghouse-Amrail's offer of $1,012,200 per car.

Replacement
The R68As are scheduled to remain in service until at least 2025–30. In 2010, the MTA proposed mid-life technological upgrades for the R68As, including LED destination signs and automated announcements.

See also
 R68 (New York City Subway car), the first order

References

Further reading
 Sansone, Gene. Evolution of New York City subways: An illustrated history of New York City's transit cars, 1867-1997. New York Transit Museum Press, New York, 1997

External links

nycsubway.org - R68A page information

Train-related introductions in 1988
New York City Subway rolling stock
Kawasaki multiple units